Suruiyeh (also Romanized as Sūrū’īyeh; also known as Soroo’eyeh and Sorū’īyeh) is a village in Dashtab Rural District, in the Central District of Baft County, Kerman Province, Iran. At the 2006 census, its population was 81, in 23 families.

References 

Populated places in Baft County